Dmitry Petrov (born 29 August 1992) is a Belarusian former professional football player.

External links
Profile at FC Lida website

1992 births
Living people
Belarusian footballers
Association football midfielders
FC Kommunalnik Slonim players
FC Lida players
People from Lida
Sportspeople from Grodno Region